Cao Ningning (born November 20, 1987) is a Chinese para table tennis player. He won a gold and a silver at the 2012 Summer Paralympics and a gold medal at the 2016 Summer Paralympics.

Like many of his teammates, Cao was a polio survivor from Pizhou who attended New Hope Center as a child. That's where coach Heng Xin developed him into a star.

Personal life
Cao Ningning is married to South Korean para table tennis player Moon Sung Hye. They met for the first time in 2007, and fell in love in 2011. The couple wed in 2013 and have 3 daughters together.

References 

1987 births
Living people
Chinese male table tennis players
Medalists at the 2012 Summer Paralympics
Medalists at the 2016 Summer Paralympics
Table tennis players at the 2016 Summer Paralympics
Table tennis players at the 2012 Summer Paralympics
Paralympic gold medalists for China
Paralympic silver medalists for China
Paralympic table tennis players of China
People with polio
Paralympic medalists in table tennis
Para table tennis players from Pizhou
Table tennis players at the 2020 Summer Paralympics
FESPIC Games competitors
21st-century Chinese people